Aurora Redondo Pérez (1 January 1900 – 9 July 1996) was a Spanish actress.

Biography

Aurora Redondo began her theatrical career at age 7. Arniches, in addition, was the best man of her wedding with actor  in 1925.

The two worked together on many occasions, interpreting works by the Quintero brothers, Pedro Muñoz Seca, Jacinto Benavente, and Carlos Arniches, among others.

Despite her dedication to theater, she also made inroads into film and television, notably her role in the 1983 series .

Aurora Redondo died from natural causes on 9 July 1996 at age 96. Her body was incinerated in the crematorium of the Cementerio de la Almudena the next day, and the urn with her ashes was interred in the family vault at the same cemetery.

Selected roles

Theater

Film

Television

References

External links

 
 "Protagonistas del recuerdo – Aurora Redondo" at RTVE 

1900 births
1996 deaths
20th-century Spanish actresses
Actresses from Barcelona
Burials at Cementerio de la Almudena
Film actresses from Catalonia
Stage actresses from Catalonia
Television actresses from Catalonia
Spanish silent film actresses
Spanish voice actresses